The 1988 NAIA women's basketball tournament was the eighth annual tournament held by the NAIA to determine the national champion of women's college basketball among its members in the United States and Canada.

Oklahoma City defeated Claflin in the championship game, 113–95, to claim the Chiefs' first NAIA national title. 

The tournament was played in Kansas City, Missouri.

Qualification

The tournament field remained fixed at sixteen teams, with seeds assigned to the top eight teams.

The tournament utilized a simple single-elimination format, with an additional third-place game for the two teams that lost in the semifinals.

Bracket

See also
1988 NCAA Division I women's basketball tournament
1988 NCAA Division II women's basketball tournament
1988 NCAA Division III women's basketball tournament
1988 NAIA men's basketball tournament

References

NAIA
NAIA Women's Basketball Championships
1988 in sports in Missouri